Mathias Otto Leth Sommerhielm (22 August 1764 15 November 1827) was a Danish-Norwegian politician who served as the Norwegian prime minister in Stockholm.

Biography
Mathias Otto Leth Sommerhielm was born in the seaport of Kolding in southern Denmark. He graduated from the University of Copenhagen with degrees in Latin and Law in 1785. He subsequently moved to Christiania where he was appointed a prosecutor in 1789. In 1801,  Sommerhielm became director general of military prosecutions and in 1807 he became member of the Superior Criminal Court.

After Denmark's loss of Norway to Sweden, he attended the Meeting of Notables in Eidsvoll on 16 February 1814. He served as First Minister from 1815 to 1822, a position assigned to the most prominent cabinet minister at the time.  In 1822, Sommerhielm was appointed Prime Minister of Norway, following the resignation of Peder Anker due to personal illness.  Sommerhielm became Norway's second prime minister, an office located in Stockholm. He held the office until 1827, when the seat was vacated. He died in Stockholm later that year.

Awards
Sommerhielm was awarded the Order of the Dannebrog (Dannebrogordenen), Order of the Polar Star (Nordstjerneorden)  and  Seraphim Medal (Serafimerordenen).

References

External links
Matthias Otto Leth Sommerhielm (Statsrådsaktivitet)

1764 births
1827 deaths
Government ministers of Norway
19th-century Norwegian politicians
Members of the Storting
People from Kolding
University of Copenhagen alumni
Order of the Dannebrog
Order of the Polar Star
Ministers of Justice of Norway